Canadian National Railway (CN) Class E-7 steam locomotives were of 2-6-0 wheel arrangement in the Whyte notation, or 1′C in UIC classification. These locomotives were built for the Grand Trunk Railway (GT) from 1898 through 1908. GT began adding superheaters to these locomotives in 1913. CN simplified the last compound and continued the superheating conversions, but some locomotives never received superheaters. Most of the class were scrapped in the 1930s; but number 713 worked on the Berlin Subdivision branch to Lewiston, Maine, until replaced by diesel locomotives in 1957, and was preserved in the Canadian Railway Museum.

References 

2-6-0 locomotives
Baldwin locomotives
MLW locomotives
CLC locomotives
Dickson locomotives
Schenectady Locomotive Works locomotives
E-07
Grand Trunk Railway
Standard gauge locomotives of Canada
Standard gauge locomotives of the United States